The 1957 Nobel Prize in Literature was awarded the French writer Albert Camus (1913–1960) "for his important literary production, which with clear-sighted earnestness illuminates the problems of the human conscience in our times." He is the ninth French author to become a recipient of the prize after Catholic novelist François Mauriac in 1952, and the fourth philosopher after British analytic philosopher Bertrand Russell in 1950.

Aged 44 when he received the prize, Camus is the second youngest recipient of the Nobel Prize in Literature.

Laureate

Camus made his debut as a writer in 1937, but his breakthrough came with the novel L’étranger ("The Stranger"), published in 1942. It concerns the absurdity of life, a theme he returns to in other books, including his philosophical work Le mythe de Sisyphe ("The Myth of Sisyphus", 1942). He also worked as a journalist and playwright with Caligula (1944), which received praises from theatre critics. Because of his friendship with Jean-Paul Sartre, Camus was labeled an existentialist, but he preferred not to be linked with any ideology. His other successful novels include La peste ("The Plague", 1947), La chute ("The Fall", 1956), and an unfinished autobiography, Le Premier homme ("The First Man"), was published posthumously.

Deliberations

Nominations
Albert Camus was nominated for the Nobel Prize in literature on 11 occasions, the first time in 1949. He was nominated once in 1957 by a French professor of Anglo-Saxon language and literature from the Caen University, which he was awarded afterwards. 

In total, the Nobel committee received 66 nominations for 49 individuals, including Nikos Kazantzakis, E. M. Forster, Alberto Moravia, Georges Duhamel, Jules Romains, Ezra Pound, Saint-John Perse (awarded in 1960), Carlo Levi, Boris Pasternak (awarded in 1958) and Robert Frost. 12 of the nominees were nominated first-time among them Jean-Paul Sartre (awarded in 1964), Lennox Robinson, Jan Parandowski, Samuel Beckett (awarded in 1969), Jarosław Iwaszkiewicz, André Chamson, Väinö Linna and Carlo Levi. The nominee with the highest number of nominations – 4 nominations – was for André Malraux. Four of the nominees were women namely Gertrud von Le Fort, Karen Blixen, Henriette Charasson, and Maria Dąbrowska. 

The authors Nurullah Ataç, Erich Auerbach, Arturo Barea, Ernst Bertram, Roy Campbell, Joyce Cary, José Lins do Rego, Alfred Döblin, Claude Farrère, Peter Freuchen, Rose Fyleman, Oliver St. John Gogarty, Sacha Guitry, Laura Ingalls Wilder, Eric Alfred Knudsen, Barbu Lăzăreanu, Wyndham Lewis, Malcolm Lowry, Mait Metsanurk, Christopher Morley, Gilbert Murray, Ralph Barton Perry, Clemente Rebora, Aleksey Remizov, Umberto Saba, Dorothy L. Sayers, and Giuseppe Tomasi di Lampedusa died in 1957 without having been nominated for the prize. French poet Valery Larbaud died before the only chance to be rewarded.

Award ceremony speech

In his award ceremony speech on 10 December 1957 Anders Österling, permanent secretary of the Swedish Academy, said of Camus:

References

External links
Award Ceremony speech nobelprize.org
List of all nominations for the 1957 Nobel Prize in literature nobelprize.org

1957
Albert Camus